Jean Robert Yelou (born 25 September 1983 in Tanna, Vanuatu) was a footballer who played as a midfielder. He previously played for Tafea and Amicale. He is the current head coach of Vanuatu giant Amicale in the Port Vila Premier League. Yelou is also the assistant coach of the Vanuatu national football team.

References

1983 births
Living people
Vanuatuan footballers
Vanuatu international footballers
Tafea F.C. players
2002 OFC Nations Cup players
2008 OFC Nations Cup players
2012 OFC Nations Cup players
Association football midfielders
Women's national association football team managers